Eucharassus nigratus is a species of beetle in the family Cerambycidae. It was described by Martins and Galileo in 2009.

References

Necydalopsini
Beetles described in 2009